Ichneutica ustistriga is a moth of the family Noctuidae. It is endemic to New Zealand and can be found from the Three Kings Islands to Stewart Island. This species lives in a wide variety of habitats including domestic gardens, horticultural areas, orchards, native and exotic grasslands, as well as native forest. The larvae eat a variety of herbaceous plants. Recorded food plants include Muehlenbeckia australis, Muehlenbeckia complexa, Olearia hectorii,  Plantago lanceolata, and Urtica australis. This moth has a mauvish grey wing colour and is unlikely to be confused with other species as the patterns on its forewing are distinctive. This species is on the wing throughout the year and is attracted to both sugar and light traps. Adult moths can be found at rest on fences and tree trunks during the day.

Taxonomy 
This species was described by Francis Walker in 1857 using a specimen obtained from William Colenso. The female lectotype is held at the Natural History Museum, London. In 1988 J. S. Dugdale placed this species within the Graphania genus. In 2019 Robert Hoare undertook a major review of New Zealand Noctuidae. During this review the genus Ichneutica was greatly expanded and the genus Graphania was subsumed into that genus as a synonym. As a result of this review, this species is now known as Ichneutica ustistriga.

Description 
George Hudson describes the egg of this species as follows:

Hudson described the larva of this species as follows:

Walker originally described the adults of this species as follows: 
The adult male of this species has a wingspan of between 36 and 46 mm where as the female has a wingspan of between 38 and 53 mm. This moth has a mauvish grey wing colour and is unlikely to be confused with other species as the patterns on its forewing are distinctive.

Distribution 
It is endemic to New Zealand and can be found from the Three Kings Islands to Stewart Island.

Habitat 
This species lives in a wide variety of habitats including domestic gardens, horticultural areas, orchards, native and exotic grasslands, as well as native forest.

Behaviour
This species is on the wing throughout the year and is attracted to both sugar and light traps. Adult moths can be found at rest on fences and tree trunks during the day.

Life history and host species 

The larvae eat a variety of herbaceous plants. Recorded food plants include Muehlenbeckia australis, Muehlenbeckia complexa, Olearia hectorii,  Plantago lanceolata, and Urtica australis.

Interaction with humans 
A recent study suggests this moth may be assisting with the pollination of avocado trees.

References

Hadeninae
Moths of New Zealand
Endemic fauna of New Zealand
Moths described in 1857
Taxa named by Francis Walker (entomologist)
Endemic moths of New Zealand